The Multani Caravanserai is a caravanserai located in Baku, Azerbaijan. It was established in the 14th century and is located opposite to the Bukhara Caravanserai. 

The caravanserai was built to house merchants from the medieval city of Multan (now in Punjab, Pakistan) who frequented the region for trade, and used this caravanserai as a stop. They included Zoroastrians, who are also believed to have erected the Ateshgah Temple in Surakhani. 

The caravanserai has a square shape and the construction of the building is in an ancient style. There are a lot of balconies around the courtyard. Now the Multani Caravanserai houses a restaurant of Azerbaijani cuisine. In 2020, restoration works were commenced on the site with a completion time of 2022.

The caravanserai has been linked to the historical relationship between Azerbaijan and Pakistan.

References

Azerbaijani culture
Azerbaijan–Pakistan relations
Caravanserais in Azerbaijan
History of Multan
Tourist attractions in Baku
Icherisheher